Joshua Lynn Hull (born May 21, 1987) is a former American football linebacker. He was selected by the St. Louis Rams in seventh round of the 2010 NFL Draft. He played college football for Penn State.

Early life
Hull grew up in Millheim, Pennsylvania, approximately 25 miles east of State College, Pennsylvania. He attended Penns Valley High School, where he played football under coach Martin Tobias. He was a three-year starter, serving as team captain and defensive captain as a senior. Hull was selected first-team all-conference on defense after his senior season and was a team captain in the 2006 Lezzer Lumber Classic. He was also a three-year letterman on the baseball team, earning first-team all-conference accolades as an outfielder.

College career

A former walk-on, Hull became a starter in 2008 when pre-season All-American Sean Lee suffered a season-ending knee injury in spring practice. Hull was the starter for all 13 games that season, finishing as the second leading tackler behind NaVorro Bowman with 66 tackles, one quarterback sack, and one interception. He had a game-high nine tackles in the 2009 Rose Bowl.

Hull was also recognized for academics while at Penn State.  He was a member of the Dean's List and was named an Academic All-Big Ten scholar-athlete, while majoring in environmental systems engineering. He was named a 2008 Academic All-American, and an inaugural recipient of a Big Ten Distinguished Scholar Award for the 2008-09 academic year.

Professional career
Hull played in the 4th Annual Texas vs. The Nation All-Star Challenge in El Paso, Texas, on February 6, 2010.

Pre-draft

Although not initially invited to the 2010 NFL Scouting Combine, he was added to the list of  invitees on January 29, 2010. Hull and teammate Dennis Landolt trained for the combine at TEST in Martinsville, New Jersey, based partially on the recommendation of his agent, Joe Aloisi and former Nittany Lion Rich Ohrnberger.

St. Louis Rams
Hull was drafted by the St. Louis Rams in the seventh round (#254 overall) of the 2010 NFL Draft. He signed a four-year contract with the Rams on June 28, 2010. Hull was released by the Rams on August 30, 2013.

Washington Redskins
The Washington Redskins signed Hull on October 15, 2013. He was released on April 5, 2014.

New England Patriots
On April 24, 2014, Hull signed a one-year deal with the New England Patriots. Hull was waived by the team on July 28, 2014.

Jacksonville Jaguars
Hull signed with the Jacksonville Jaguars on August 2, 2014. The Jaguars released Hull on August 24, 2014.

References

External links
New England Patriots bio
Washington Redskins bio
St. Louis Rams bio
Penn State Nittany Lions bio

1987 births
Living people
People from State College, Pennsylvania
American football linebackers
Players of American football from Pennsylvania
Penn State Nittany Lions football players
St. Louis Rams players
Washington Redskins players
New England Patriots players
Jacksonville Jaguars players